Jason Corey Gardner (born November 14, 1980) is an American retired professional basketball player and currently a player relations director at the University of Arizona.

Gardner is a native of Indianapolis, Indiana, playing his high school ball at North Central High Sxhool. He was honored at Indiana Mr. Basketball in 1999. The  point guard then starred at Arizona from 1999 to 2003. His team finished second place in the 2001 NCAA Men's Division I Basketball Tournament, losing to Duke University. As a senior in 2003, Gardner was named an Associated Press Second Team All-American after averaging 14.8 points and 4.9 assists per game. His college jersey number was retired by the University of Arizona in 2005.

Gardner was not drafted by the NBA, but found success overseas. He played in Slovenia, Belgium, and Israel, and with EWE Baskets Oldenburg in Germany.  He was a 2x All-Star in Germany, appearing in the Basketball Bundesliga's All-Star Game in 2007, and starting for the Northern All-Star Team in the Basketball Bundesliga's All-Star Game in 2009. He was also named 2008/2009 regular season MVP of the German Basketball Bundesliga. For the season he averaged 13.7 points 4.0 assists and 3.0 rebounds on shooting 40.8% from the field 37.5% from three-point range and 82.9% from the line. He recorded a season high of 25 points against the Telekom Baskets Bonn. Gardner led his team to a 25–9 record finishing third in the regular season.

In 2011, Gardner joined the coaching staff of Loyola University Chicago.  Gardner left Loyola to join Josh Pastner's staff at the University of Memphis in the summer of 2013.

After just one season with Memphis, Gardner was named the head coach at IUPUI.  Gardner was arrested for driving while impaired by Fishers, Indiana police on Aug 26, 2019 and resigned his coaching position the next day.  

On August 12, 2020, nearly a year after resigning from IUPUI, Gardner was named the head coach of the North Central High School boys basketball team, returning to the school where he played his high school career. 

However, after just a year there, he accepted a player relations director at his alma mater, the University of Arizona.

Head coaching record

References

External links
General
IUPUI Jags Bio
Profile at Eurobasket.com
Basketball Bundesliga Profile 
Loyola Chicago coaching bio

1980 births
Living people
All-American college men's basketball players
American expatriate basketball people in Australia
American expatriate basketball people in Belgium
American expatriate basketball people in Germany
American expatriate basketball people in Israel
American expatriate basketball people in Slovenia
American men's basketball players
Arizona Wildcats men's basketball players
Basketball coaches from Indiana
Basketball players from Indianapolis
BC Oostende players
EWE Baskets Oldenburg players
Ironi Ramat Gan players
IUPUI Jaguars men's basketball coaches
KK Krka players
Loyola Ramblers men's basketball coaches
McDonald's High School All-Americans
Memphis Tigers men's basketball coaches
Parade High School All-Americans (boys' basketball)
Point guards
Townsville Crocodiles players